The Eindhoven–Weert railway is a railway line in the Netherlands running from Eindhoven to Weert. The line was opened in 1913. It is an important link between the cities in the western and northern part of the Netherlands, and the Limburgish cities of Maastricht and Heerlen.

Stations
The main interchange stations on the Eindhoven–Weert railway are:

Eindhoven: to Breda and Utrecht
Weert: to Roermond, Heerlen and Maastricht

Railway lines in the Netherlands
Railway lines in Limburg (Netherlands)
Railway lines in North Brabant
Rail transport in Eindhoven
Transport in Weert